The Greater Attleboro Taunton Regional Transit Authority (GATRA) oversees and coordinates public and medical  transportation in the areas of Attleboro and Taunton, Massachusetts and 24 nearby areas. It operates daily (except on Sundays) fixed bus routes, commuter shuttle services and Dial-A-Ride services for seniors and persons with disabilities within communities in Bristol, Norfolk, and Plymouth counties. GATRA is based at the Bloom Bus Terminal in Taunton.

As of 2011, the member municipalities are Attleboro, Bellingham, Berkley, Carver, Dighton, Duxbury, Foxborough, Franklin, Kingston, Lakeville, Marshfield, Mansfield, Medway, Middleborough, Norfolk, North Attleborough, Norton, Pembroke, Plainville, Plymouth, Raynham, Rehoboth, Seekonk, Taunton, Wareham and Wrentham.

GATRA's territory overlaps with the Southeastern Massachusetts and Old Colony MPOs.

Route list
1 Westside
3 Silver City Galleria/Myles Standish Industrial Park
6 Whittenton
7 School St./Raynham
8 E. Taunton/Raynham
9 Weir/Route 138
10 Attleboro/N. Attleboro
11 S. Attleboro Connector
12 S. Attleboro/Attleboro
14 Attleboro/Plainville
15 Oak Hill
16 Seekonk/Attleboro
18 Attleboro/Norton/Taunton
24 Attleboro/Pawtuckect 
140 Route 140/North Mansfield
Plymouth Area Link (PAL)
Franklin Area Bus (FAB)
Marshfield/Duxbury/Kingston Line (SAIL)
Onset/Wareham Link (OWL)
Pembroke Shuttle
Bellingham Shuttles
Medway MBTA Shuttle
Wareham-Middleborough MBTA Shuttle

See also
 Brockton Area Transit Authority, also serving the same counties of Bristol, Norfolk, and Plymouth.

References

External links
Greater Attleboro Taunton Regional Transit Authority
H & L Bloom, Inc.
Plymouth and Brockton Bus

Bus transportation in Massachusetts
Greater Taunton Area
Transportation in Bristol County, Massachusetts
Transportation in Plymouth County, Massachusetts